Futebol Clube de Cabinda is a football club based in Cabinda, Angola. The club was created as an affiliate to F.C. Porto and uses the same colours.

The club has been banned by FIFA from entering any official competition until a debt with former player Luciano Câmara is settled.

League and cup positions

Presidents

Manager history

Players

2008–2012

1991–2000

1979–1986

See also 
 Girabola
 Gira Angola

External links 
 Facebook 

F.C. Cabinda
F.C. Cabinda
Association football clubs established in 1956
1956 establishments in Angola